Quezeliantha is a monotypic genus of flowering plants belonging to the family Brassicaceae. It only contains one known species, Quezeliantha tibestica (H.Scholz) H.Scholz and has a synonym, Quezelia .

It is native to Chad.

The genus name of Quezeliantha is in honour of Pierre Ambrunaz Quézel (1926–2015), a French doctor, botanist and ecologist. The Latin specific epithet of tibestica refers to the Tibesti Mountains in the central Sahara, in Chad.
Both the genus and the species were first described and published in Taxon Vol.31 on page 558 in 1982.

References

Brassicaceae
Brassicaceae genera
Plants described in 1982
Flora of Chad